NMP22 is a tumor marker for bladder cancer.
NMP22 is the abbreviated form of Nuclear Matrix Protein Number 22.
It reflects the mitotic activity of cells.

References

Tumor markers